Wyulda is a genus of phalanger. The scaly-tailed possum is the only extant species, but a single extinct species (Wyulda asherjoeli) from the Miocene is known as well.

References

Mammal genera
Mammal genera with one living species
Taxa named by Wilfred Backhouse Alexander
Possums